Barcelos, (also Barcellos), formerly Mariuá, is a municipality located in the State of Amazonas, northern Brazil.

About 
The city is served by Barcelos Airport with scheduled services to Manaus.

Since 1994, Barcelos has been the host of an annual festival celebrating ornamental fish, which is a significant source of income for the region. Project Piaba uses Barcelos as the starting point for their annual research expedition into the Rio Negro area.

The municipality contains part of the Amanã Sustainable Development Reserve.
It also contains part of the Amazonas National Forest.
It contains the  Rio Unini Extractive Reserve, created in 2006.

History

Barcelos was originally named Mariuá, village of the Manaus Indians. When the captaincy of São José do Rio Negro was formed in 1755, Francisco Xavier de Mendonça Furtado, Governor General of state of Grao Para e Maranhao chose the aldeia de São José do Javari, a village founded by Carmelite Friar Matias São Boaventuras in 1728 near the mouth of the Javari River, as its capital. It was the capital of the captaincy of São José do Rio Negro from 1755–1791, and again from 1799–1808.

Climate
The climate reflects its vegetation being tropical rainforest or equatorial (Köppen: Af), like the rest of the Amazon Basin.

References

External links

Municipalities in Amazonas (Brazilian state)